Charles Prince Airport , formerly named Mount Hampden and renamed after former airport manager Charles Prince (who was a Royal Air Force officer during World War II), is approximately  northwest of Harare, Zimbabwe.

During World War II it served as a Rhodesian Air Training Group location, training pilots for the British Commonwealth Air Training Plan. In 1973 the airport was converted to civilian use.

The Harare-Charles Prince non-directional beacon (Ident: CP) is located on the field.

See also
Transport in Zimbabwe
List of airports in Zimbabwe

References

External links
 OurAirports - Charles Prince
 World Aero Data
 Zimbabwe Military Air Bases and Airfields
 OpenStreetMap - Charles Prince Airport
 Rhodesia aviation

Harare
Airports in Zimbabwe